The Craigieburn Range forms part of the Southern Alps in New Zealand's South Island. The range is located on the south banks of the Waimakariri River, south of Arthur's Pass and west of State Highway 73. The Craigieburn locality is adjacent to the Craigieburn Forest Park.

Named Peaks 
There are a number of named peaks located within the Craigieburn Range (north to south):
 Baldy Hill 
 Hamilton Peak 
 Nervous Knob 
 Mount Wall 
 Mount Cockayne 
 Mount Cheeseman 
 Mount Olympus 
 Mount Izard  Named after William Izard (1851–1940)
 Mount Cloudesley 
 Mount Enys 
 Carn Brea 
Willis Peak  Named after Paul Hedley Willis (1941–2011) 
 Blue Hill

Ski Fields 
The Craigieburn Valley Ski Area is located east of Hamilton Peak. The Broken River Ski Area is located east of Nervous Knob, and north of Mount Wall. A third ski field, Mount Cheeseman, is located east of Mount Cockayne and north of the mountain from which it took its name. Also Porters ski area at the south end of the range.  All four ski fields are accessible from State Highway 73.  A fifth ski field, Mount Olympus Ski Area, is accessible via Windwhistle.

References

Mountain ranges of the Southern Alps
Mountain ranges of Canterbury, New Zealand